Xiaosheng is a town located in Fengshun County, Meizhou City, Guangdong Province, China. , it has 11 villages under its administration: 
Xiaosheng Village
Zhongshe Village
Danan Village
Tianbei Village
Tianmianjiao Village
Sankeng Village
Heping Village
Zhukeng Village
Danzhu Village
Zaixia Village
Xiaoxi Village

See also 
List of township-level divisions of Guangdong

References

External links 
Official website of the Fengshun County Government

Towns in Guangdong
Fengshun County